The National Foundation of Science and Advanced Technologies (NFSAT) is an Armenian non-profit, voluntary organization established in 1997 by legislation. Its mission is to develop the scientific and engineering potential of Armenia. The headquarters of the federation is located in Yerevan.

Objectives
NFSAT's mission is to promote scientific research and technological development in various fields within conformity with international standards, as well as to provide financial and technological support for scientific research and project development. The foundation has several grants which are available for Armenian scientists and engineers.

See also

Science and technology in Armenia

External links
Official website
National Foundation of Science and Advanced Technologies on Facebook

Science and technology in Armenia
Organizations established in 1997